Nerkoonjärvi is a medium-sized lake in the Vuoksi main catchment area. It is located in Iisalmi and Lapinlahti, in Northern Savonia region, Finland.

See also
List of lakes in Finland

References

Lapinlahti
Lakes of Iisalmi